Guo Wenli (born March 2, 1989) is a Chinese male curler.

At the international level, he is a 2015 World Mixed bronze medallist and a 2010 Pacific junior champion curler.

Teams

Men's

Mixed

Mixed doubles

References

External links

Living people
1989 births
Sportspeople from Harbin
Chinese male curlers
Place of birth missing (living people)